Lorenzo Dellai (born 28 November 1959 in Trento) is an Italian politician deputy of the Chamber of Deputies, and former governor of the Autonomous Province of Trento and former President of the region of Trentino-Alto Adige/Südtirol.

Background

He was elected mayor of Trento for the first time in 1990, and re-elected in 1995.

In 1998 Lorenzo Dellai founded the Daisy Civic List, a regional political party active in Trentino.

Dellai has been the President of the Province of Trentino since 1999, and the President of Trentino-Alto Adige/Südtirol since 2006. He joined Civic Choice and was elected deputy on electoral district Trentino Alto Adige.

External links
 Information on the website of the Province of Trento

1959 births
Living people
Presidents of Trentino-Alto Adige/Südtirol
Members of the Regional Council of Trentino-Alto Adige
People from Trento
Christian Democracy (Italy) politicians
20th-century Italian politicians
Democracy is Freedom – The Daisy politicians
21st-century Italian politicians
Civic Choice politicians
Members of the Chamber of Deputies (Italy)
Solidary Democracy politicians
Mayors of Trento
Presidents of Trentino
Daisy Civic List politicians